Abanar or Ab-e Anar or Ab Anar ( or ) may refer to:
 Ab Anar, Marvdasht, Fars Province
 Abanar, Ilam
 Ab Anar, Khuzestan
 Abanar Rural District, in Ilam Province